Waterloo (2021 population 4,920) is a city in the Canadian province of Quebec. It is included in La Haute-Yamaska Regional County Municipality, in the administrative area of Estrie. Completely encircled by the township of Shefford, this residential city is located within the Eastern Townships, about ninety kilometers east of Montreal.

History

The town was first settled in 1793 by Ezekiel Lewis, an English Loyalist supporter who was originally from Marlborough, New Hampshire. He named his location Lewis Falls and after 9 years, Captain Lewis sold his lot and moved a short distance away. The land was purchased by William Lamoure, a merchant from St-Armand who then sold it to Lazare Letourneau who in turn sold it to Hezekiah Robinson in 1822. Robinson immediately renamed Lewis Falls to Waterloo after the famous battle in which Napoleon Bonaparte was defeated. The name Waterloo was suggested by his father-in-law, Judge Knowlton. Hezekiah Robinson built "The Old Stone Store" in 1829 at the corner of Main Street and Ellis.He donated the land for the first Church of England built in 1843 and his widow donated Robinson Park in 1868 plus the land for the French school. In 1843, Waterloo became the county seat replacing Frost Village.

In 1861, Asa Belnap Foster, a prominent Canadian railway builder and politician, brought the railroad to Waterloo which helped expand the village to a thriving town. Its population increased from 200 in 1857 to 1500 in 1867. Foster developed the south end of the town where the railway station was located and connected the old village to it by constructing Foster Street, at his own expense, which still exists today as Waterloo's main street. A. B Foster also donated the land for all the churches in town plus the local high school. Additionally, Foster also rebuilt Lewis Bridge at his own expense when the bridge fell into disrepair. In 1864 Colonel Foster built Maplewood, a beautiful estate on Clark Hill. When Waterloo was incorporated in 1867, A.B. Foster was elected its first mayor.

Waterloo has been the home of a number of noteworthy persons including A.B. Foster - a former member of Parliament, Canadian Senator, colonel of the militia and railway baron known as "Canada's Railway King". Also, John R. Booth was born in Waterloo in 1827 and after moving to Ottawa became one of the wealthiest men in Canada and was known as "The Lumber King Of Canada". Lucius Huntington, a Waterloo resident and local member of Parliament revealed in a speech in Parliament the details of what was to become "the Pacific Scandal" which lead to the election defeat of Sir John A. Macdonald. (the Conservative Party believed A. B. Foster was his source).

Waterloo became the summer residence of Montreal industrialist James Davidson in the 1880s. Davidson was the son of Scottish immigrant Thomas Davidson, who founded The Thos. Davidson Manufacturing Company, Ltd., a producer of enameled tinware with offices throughout Canada and around the world.  Davidson established "Ayrmont Farm" on the western side of the town. The main house, "Orford View," still stands on Mountain Street. The guest bungalow across the road and surrounding property are still in the hands of the family.

From the late 1990s to the early 2000s the town of Waterloo was home to the headquarters of Canadian furniture company Roxton Inc, a company that specialized in making handcrafted furniture products. The company was shuttered in the early 2000s as a result of increased foreign competition that cut into the company's profit margins.

Today, the town is the only Waterloo in the world outside Europe that is predominantly French-speaking; the remainder are all located in English-speaking regions.

Demographics 

Population trend:

Mother tongue language

Twin Cities
Waterloo, Quebec, was bound in 1957 with the town of Waterloo in Belgium. To commemorate this union each of the two Waterloos have in them a statue representing a little boy and a small girl sheltering under a mushroom.

See also
List of cities in Quebec

References

External links

 
Incorporated places in La Haute-Yamaska Regional County Municipality
Cities and towns in Quebec